Siddapur (also Siddapurwadi) is a mid-sized town located in the Belgaum district, Karnataka state in India about  south of the Krishna River.

References

External links
 Map of Siddapur, Belgaum, Karnataka, India
 Belgaum district site

Villages in Belagavi district